Numm is a 2013 Pakistani drama serial that portrays social issues. It was directed by Ahson Talish, produced by Amjad Hashmi and written by Myra Sajid. The show stars Fawad Khan, Sania Saeed and Kanza Wayne.

The show tells the story of strict customs and rituals of feudal times and its impact. The plot revolves around three people: Wali Bakht Khan, Mahjabeen and Neelum. It shows the effect of unwise traditions and old customs on this triangle relationship. Numm aired on 24 August 2013 worldwide by Geo Entertainment. Ahson Talish also acted in small scenes as a male protagonist (Fawad khan) father. The theme song of drama gained popularity among fans and viewer. It received mixed reviews from the critics.

Cast
 Fawad Khan as Wali Bakht Khan, the youngest and strongest child of his family. After Khan returns from Oxford with a graduation degree, he is forced to marry with Neelum Akbar Khan. It is later revealed that he was first married to Mahjabeen who is now a servant in his household.
 Sania Saeed as Mahjabeen
 Female protagonist and first wife of his cousin and Male lead, Wali Bakht, a hopeless and quiet girl who is seemingly satisfied with her life.
 
 Kanza Wayne as Neelum Akbar Khan 
 Second female protagonist and childhood fiance of Wali Bakht and later his wife, a panic and rebel character who is against her family traditions and customs.

 Usman Peerzada as Sikander Bakht: 
 A landlord/feudal head of a family and grandfather of male lead Wali bakht, who is a decision maker and proud family head of his breed's traditions.

 Ahson Talish as Jahangir Bakht:
 Father of male lead Wali Bakht and son of Sikander Bakht, a flashback character who actually died and just be shown in postscript scenes and drawbacks.

 Farah Shah as Amtul Jahangir Bakht:
 Mother of Wali bakht and mentally ill widowed of Jahangir Bakht, an educated woman who is also a victim of her family customs.
  
 Munazzah Arif as Rahat Akbar Khan:
 Mother of female protagonist Neelum Akbar Khan, and widow of Akbar khan.

 Nasreen Qureshi as Ammu:
 Mother of Akbar khan, thus grandmother of Neelum Akbar khan.

 Other cast includes, Shireen Zahid, Malik Tanveer, Sitara, Maryam Shah, Hashir, Jawad Butt, Raiz Balouch, Muhammad Agha and Ali Javed in less prominent and narrow supporting scenes.

Production

Development
The Numm Drama serial was actually planned to on-air in mid of 2012 or in early 2013, but due to cast selection and other technical issues, productions goes late. Ahson Talish son of Pakistani legendary actor late Agha Talish starts direction in late November 2012 and starts directing in early December with its assembled cast Fawad Khan, Sania Saeed and new up-comer and VJ, Kanza Wayne. The serial is produced by Agha Talish Productions and Q Link Productions. The serial is produced by Amjad Hashmi and co-produced by Ahson Talish's son Raza Talish and Tasneem Ahson. Ahson hired screenwriter Myra Sajid which starts her career as a playwright previously with Ahson's another project.

Casting
Casting of Numm includes some very highly popular starlets, including Fawad Khan, Sania Saeed and Usman Peerzada with newcomer Kanza Wayne. PTV actress Farah Shah who rose to her stardom in the first modern age acclaimed soap serial Landa Bazar and Boota from Toba Tek Singh selected to portray the supporting character of Amtul while Nasreen Qureshi also bags the role of Ammu.

Dramatization
Ahson Talish began his direction in late December 2012 and finished it July 2013. Most of the drama was shot in Lahore and Abbotabad. Numm released its promos in late July until its airing.

Original soundtrack

The Theme song of Numm is its original soundtrack, written by Ahson Talish the director of serial, and composed by Muhammad Agha. The music is separately produced by Haider Hashmi and co-produced by Imran Khalil. The song is sung by talented Faiza Mujahid who rose to fame by Bandya Ho from the 2012 Critically acclaimed Pakistani movie Khuda Kay Liye. The lyrics were penned down by Ahson beautifully and gain a huge acclaim.

Track listing

See also
List of Numm episodes

References

External links
 
 Numm On TV.com.pk
 Numm On Harpalgeo.tv

Urdu-language television shows
Pakistani drama television series
2013 Pakistani television series debuts
Geo TV original programming
2013 Pakistani television series endings